Saunderson is a surname. It may refer to:

 Alexander Saunderson (1783–1857), Irish Whig politician, Francis's son.
 Ann Saunderson (born 1967), British dance/soul artist
 Bill Saunderson (born  1934), Canadian politician
 Edward James Saunderson (1837–1906), Anglo-Irish politician and landowner, Alexander's son.
 Francis Saunderson (1754–1827), Anglo-Irish politician
 Frances Lumley-Saunderson, Countess of Scarbrough (died 1772), British courtier
 George Lumley-Saunderson, 5th Earl of Scarbrough (1753–1807), British peer
 George Saunderson, 5th Viscount Castleton (1631–1714), English politician
 James Saunderson, 1st Earl Castleton ( 1667–1723), English aristocrat and politician
 Jason M. Saunderson (1886–1950), US football, basketball, and baseball coach
 John Saunderson (born 1948), British-born Australian politician
 Kevin Saunderson (born 1964), US electronic music producer, originator of techno music
 Mary Saunderson (1637–1712), British actress and opera singer
 Nicholas Saunderson (1682–1739), English scientist and mathematician who was blind
 Richard Lumley-Saunderson (disambiguation) (two people)
 Thomas Lumley-Saunderson, 3rd Earl of Scarbrough ( 1691–1752), British peer, army officer, and diplomat

English-language surnames
Patronymic surnames
Surnames from given names